The following lists events that happened during 1944 in the People's Republic of Albania.

Incumbents
President: Mehdi Frashëri, Chairman of the High Council (until 28 November), Omer Nishani, Chairman of the Presidium (starting 26 May)
Prime Minister: Rexhep Bej Mitrovica (until 18 July), Fiqri Dine (18 July - 29 August), Ibrahim Biçakçiu (29 August - 28 November), Enver Hoxha (starting 22 October)

Events
January
 The National Liberation Movement, supplied with British weapons, gained control of southern Albania.
May
 The Communists met to organize an Albanian government and appointed Hoxha chairman of the executive committee and supreme commander of the National Liberation Movement.
October
 Communists establish provisional government with Hoxha as Prime Minister.
November	
 The Communists entered the capital in the wake of a German withdrawal.
December
 Communist provisional government adopts laws allowing state regulation of commercial enterprises, foreign and domestic trade.

Births
 12 January - Fatos Kongoli, writer
 17 August - Rexhep Meidani, politician, former President of Albania
 6 September - Skënder Hyka, footballer
 15 October - Sali Berisha, cardiologist and politician, former President and Prime minister of Albania

Deaths
 23 January - Rauf Fico, diplomat and politician
 February - Fuat Dibra, politician
 1 February - Vasil Shanto, one of the founders of the Albanian Communist Party
 5 March - Ismail Ndroqi, politician and philosopher
 7 August - Skënder Muço,  lawyer and leader of Balli Kombëtar
 September - Llazar Fundo, communist, later social-democratic journalist and writer

References

 
1940s in Albania
Years of the 20th century in Albania